HMS Shalford was one of 20 boats of the Ford-class of patrol boats built for the Royal Navy in the 1950s.

Their names were all chosen from villages ending in -ford. This boat was named after Shalford.

References

Ford-class seaward defence boats
Royal Navy ship names
1951 ships